Spartak Bagashvili (7 December 1914 - 1 February 1977) was a Soviet and Georgian actor. He appeared in more than twenty films from 1937 to 1975.

Selected filmography

References

External links 

1914 births
1977 deaths
Actors from Tbilisi
Male film actors from Georgia (country)
Stalin Prize winners
Recipients of the Order of the Red Banner of Labour
Burials at Didube Pantheon
Soviet male actors